Maxi On is an EP by Japanese musician Takako Minekawa. It was released on July 12, 2000 by Trattoria Records. In the United States, it was released on November 14, 2000 by Emperor Norton Records. The EP is a collaboration with American indie rock band Dymaxion.

Track listing

Personnel
Credits are adapted from the EP's liner notes.

 Takako Minekawa – performance (including acoustic guitar on "Follow My Dreams"), arrangement, production
 Ricky Domen – coordination of US recording sessions
 Dymaxion – performance, arrangement, production
 Mitsuo Koike – mastering
 Kenichi Makimura – executive production
 Shigeki Nakamura – mixing
 Jeremy Novak – bass on "Maxi On!" and "Lullaby of Gray"
 Nobuyuki Ohhashi – bass on "Lullaby of Gray"
 Makoto Ohrui – art direction, design
 Akihiro Ohshima – whistle on "Lullaby of Gray", engineering, recording
 Keigo Oyamada – electric guitar, electric sitar, and string harmonics on "Follow My Dreams"

References

External links
 

2000 EPs
Takako Minekawa EPs
Emperor Norton Records albums